pSC101 is a DNA plasmid that is used as a cloning vector in genetic cloning experiments. pSC101 was the first cloning vector, used in 1973 by Herbert Boyer and Stanley Norman Cohen. Using this plasmid they have demonstrated that a gene from a frog could be transferred into bacterial cells and then expressed by the bacterial cells.  The plasmid is a natural plasmid from Salmonella typhimurium.

History 
In the early 1970s, Herbert Boyer and Stanley Norman Cohen produced pSC101, the first plasmid vector for cloning purposes. Soon after successfully cloning two pSC101 plasmids together to create one large plasmid, they published the results describing the experiment, in 1973. The cloning of genes into plasmids occurred soon after.
In 1980, pSC101 became the first patented commercial DNA cloning vector when patents were awarded to Boyer and Cohen. The "SC" stands for Stanley Cohen. Although the original pSC101 only contained tetracycline resistance and a restriction site for EcoRI, the commercially available pSC101 gained restriction sites for several enzymes, including HindIII, in addition to the EcoRI site.

References

Molecular genetics
1973 in biotechnology
Plasmids